WOSX (91.1 FM) is a non-commercial, 300-watt college radio station registered by the Federal Communications Commission (FCC). It is currently owned and operated by The Ohio State University and licensed to serve Granville, Ohio, United States.

History
Originally WDUB and owned by Denison University, the station began as an AM "carrier current" radio station on November 12, 1953 at 7 a.m. with the Star Spangled Banner, but ceased broadcasting for a brief period of time in the 1960s, while the building that had housed its studios was being replaced. In 1969, the FCC authorized WDUB to return to the air with a 10-watt signal at 90.9 FM. During the 1970s, WDUB broadcast about 17 hours of programming per day, including open-format music, local sports, and extensive news and special events programming. Stereo broadcasting was introduced in 1975.

In the 1980s and 1990s, the station devoted its resources primarily to music, increased its power to 100 watts, increased its hours of operation, and changed its frequency to its current dial position. In the fall of 2004, WDUB began a second era of its history as the station began streaming its on-air content worldwide. During the summer of 2005, the station went through an entire digital upgrade of the main sound board, studio interconnects, catalog, recording, and record keeping functions.

Over 100 DJs volunteered to broadcast about one show per week. The open format allowed for each DJ to broadcast whatever type of music he or she preferred. The station aspired to feature 24-hour broadcasting, with shows going all night and day.

Popularity
WDUB was consistently ranked as one of America's most popular college radio stations by The Princeton Review (#20 in 2008) (#18 in 2011)  (#18 in 2012) . The station was also featured in American Eagle stores nationwide from June to September in 2009. . Most recently, WDUB was ranked 17th in The Princeton Review's list of best college radio stations ahead of the release of their 2015 guide.

Events
The first annual "Doobiepalooza", a 91.1 WDUB sponsored event, occurred on May 3, 2014. The event showcased student musicians and artists. In fall 2014, WDUB debuted two new logos, a Swasey Chapel logo and a "boombox" logo, both created by students as part of a logo creation contest.

Alumni
Numerous Denison University graduates have used their WDUB experience as an entry into the field of commercial broadcasting. Notable former DJs include actor Steve Carell and former Cleveland Browns CEO Joe Banner.

Transfer to Ohio State
On September 1, 2019, the station went silent after the students decided to move solely to an Internet radio format. The switch occurred due to changes made by the FCC, with which WDUB was having trouble complying.

On December 11, 2019, Denison University filed paperwork with the FCC to transfer the signal to The Ohio State University for $5,000, on-air announcements for four years, and paid student internships. The sale was consummated on February 24, 2020, at which point the station changed its call sign to WOSX. As part of the sale, Denison University retained the WDUB call sign.

On March 2, 2020, WOSX changed its format to a mix of news, talk, and classical music.

References

External links
 

OSX
OSX
Radio stations established in 1962
1962 establishments in Ohio